NGC 4780 is an intermediate spiral galaxy within the constellation Virgo. It is located about 166 million light-years (51 Megaparsecs) away from the Sun. It was discovered in 1880 by the astronomer Wilhelm Tempel.

References

External links 

Virgo (constellation)
Intermediate spiral galaxies
4780
043870